Electro Brain was a North American video game publisher based in Salt Lake City, Utah that was active from 1990 to 1998.

Games

NES
Puss 'n Boots: Pero's Great Adventure (1990)
Super Cars (1991)
Eliminator Boat Duel (1991)
Ghoul School (1992)
Stanley: The Search for Dr. Livingston (1992)
Best of the Best: Championship Karate (1992)

Super NES
Raiden (1992)
Boxing Legends of the Ring (1993)
Best of the Best: Championship Karate (1993)
Tony Meola's Sidekicks Soccer (1993)
Jim Power: The Lost Dimension in 3-D (1993)
Vortex (1994)
Tommy Moe's Winter Extreme: Skiing & Snowboarding (1994)

Nintendo 64
Dual Heroes (1998)
Star Soldier: Vanishing Earth (1998)

Game Boy
Fist of the North Star: 10 Big Brawls for the King of Universe (1990)
Go! Go! Tank (1990)
Dead Heat Scramble (1990)
Metal Masters (1990)
Trax (1991)
Brainbender (1991)
High Stakes Gambling (1992)
Mouse Trap Hotel (1992)
Bionic Battler (1992)
Kingdom Crusade (1992)
Best of the Best: Championship Karate (1992)
Felix the Cat (1993)
Bomberman Quest (1998)

Sega Genesis
Best of the Best: Championship Karate (1993)
Boxing Legends of the Ring (1993)

External links
 Games published by Electro Brain

Companies based in Salt Lake City
Defunct companies based in Utah
American companies established in 1990
Video game companies established in 1990
Video game companies disestablished in 1998
Defunct video game companies of the United States
Companies that filed for Chapter 11 bankruptcy in 1998
Video game publishers